Liu Jianjun (born January 5, 1969 Ningbo) is a male Chinese badminton player who played internationally in the 1990s.

Career
Liu shared a number of mixed doubles titles on the world circuit. He won the China (1991), French (1992), and Thailand (1993) Opens with Wang Xiaoyuan, and the Asian Championships (1995) with Ge Fei. Liu was a bronze medalist at the 1996 Atlanta Olympics with yet another partner, Sun Man.

External links
profile

1969 births
Living people
Badminton players from Zhejiang
Badminton players at the 1996 Summer Olympics
Olympic badminton players of China
Olympic bronze medalists for China
Olympic medalists in badminton
Asian Games medalists in badminton
Sportspeople from Ningbo
Chinese male badminton players
Badminton players at the 1994 Asian Games

Medalists at the 1996 Summer Olympics
Asian Games bronze medalists for China
Medalists at the 1994 Asian Games